Glycomonada are a proposed basal Euglenozoan clade, following Cavalier-Smith. As Euglenozoans may be basal Eukaryotes, the Glycomonada may be key to studying the evolution of Eukaryotes, including the incorporation of eukaryotic traits such as the incorporation of alphaproteobacterial mitochondrial endosymbionts.

References

Euglenozoa
Taxa named by Thomas Cavalier-Smith